Game engine recreation is a type of video game engine remastering process wherein a new game engine is written from scratch as a clone of the original with the full ability to read the original game's data files. The new engine reads the old engine's files and, in theory, loads and understands its assets in a way that is indistinguishable from the original. The result of a proper engine clone is often the ability to play a game on modern systems that the old game could no longer run on. It also opens the possibility of community collaboration, as many engine remake projects tend to be open source.

In most cases a clone is made in part by studying and reverse engineering the original executable, but occasionally, as was the case with some of the engines in ScummVM, the original developers have helped the projects by supplying the original source code—those are so-called source ports.

See also

 List of commercial video games with later released source code
 Source port
 Video game remake
 Emulator

References

External links
 Open Source Game Clones, specialized in open source variants of commercial games

 
Game engines for Linux
Open-source video games